The 1996 NAIA Division II men's basketball tournament  was the tournament held by the NAIA to determine the national champion of men's college basketball among its Division II members in the United States and Canada for the 1995–96 basketball season.

Albertson defeated Whitworth in the championship game, 81–72 after overtime, to claim the Coyotes' first NAIA national title.

The tournament was played at the Montgomery Fieldhouse at Northwest Nazarene University in Nampa, Idaho.

Qualification

The tournament field remained fixed at thirty-two teams, and the top sixteen teams were seeded. 

The tournament continued to utilize a single-elimination format.

Bracket

See also
1996 NAIA Division I men's basketball tournament
1996 NCAA Division I men's basketball tournament
1996 NCAA Division II men's basketball tournament
1996 NCAA Division III men's basketball tournament
1996 NAIA Division II women's basketball tournament

References

NAIA
NAIA Men's Basketball Championship
1996 in sports in Idaho